Shakheh-ye Mobaderi (also Romanized as Shākheh-ye Nobāderī) is a village in Hoseyni Rural District, in the Central District of Shadegan County, Khuzestan Province, Iran. At the 2006 census, its population was 92, in 17 families.

References 

Populated places in Shadegan County